This is a list of most notable films produced in Estonia and in the Estonian language in chronological order.

1912–1918
List of Estonian films made in Governorate of Estonia and Governorate of Livonia of the Russian Empire

1918–1940
List of notable Estonian films made in Republic of Estonia (1918–1940)

1920s

1930s

1940–1991
List of notable films made in the Estonian Soviet Socialist Republic.

1940s

1950s

1960s

1970s

1980s

1990s

Since 1991
List of Estonian films since 1991

See also

1991